Vestre Finnmark District Court is a district court located in northern Norway. This court is based at two different courthouses which are located in Alta and Hammerfest. The court serves 7 municipalities in the eastern part of Finnmark and one municipality (Kvænangen) in Troms. The court in Alta accepts cases from the municipalities of Alta, Loppa, and Kvænangen. The court in Hammerfest accepts cases from the municipalities of Hasvik, Hammerfest, Måsøy, Nordkapp, and Porsanger. The court is subordinate to the Hålogaland Court of Appeal.

The court is led by a chief judge and several other judges. The court is a court of first instance. Its judicial duties are mainly to settle criminal cases and to resolve civil litigation as well as bankruptcy. The administration and registration tasks of the court include death registration, issuing certain certificates, performing duties of a notary public, and officiating civil wedding ceremonies. Cases from this court are heard by a combination of professional judges and lay judges.

History
This court was established on 26 April 2021 after the old Alta District Court, Hammerfest District Court, and a small part of Nord-Troms District Court (just Kvænangen Municipality) were all merged into one court. The new district court system continues to use the courthouses from the predecessor courts.

References

District courts of Norway
2021 establishments in Norway
Organisations based in Alta, Norway
Organisations based in Hammerfest